Daniel Benedict Johnson (born 26 August 1957) is a British journalist and author who was the founding editor of Standpoint magazine.
Since 2018, he has been founding editor of  online journalism platform www.thearticle.com, an associate editor of The Critic magazine and commentator for The Daily Mail, The Mail on Sunday, and The Daily Telegraph.

Biography 
Daniel Johnson is the son of the author Paul Johnson and brother of Cosmos Johnson, Sophie Johnson-Clark and entrepreneur Luke Johnson.

After attending Langley Grammar School he graduated with a First in Modern History from Magdalen College, Oxford. Johnson was awarded a Shakespeare Scholarship to Berlin. Returning to English academia as a fellow of Queen Mary, University of London, he served as Director of Publications for the Centre for Policy Studies.

Johnson covered the fall of the Berlin Wall as German correspondent for The Daily Telegraph and has worked as a leader writer for both The Times and The Telegraph, as well as literary editor and associate editor for The Times.

In 2008, he launched Standpoint magazine as founding editor. He stood down in December 2018. He was also a contributing editor to The New York Sun and a contributor to The Times Literary Supplement, The Literary Review, Prospect, Commentary, and The New Criterion, as well as The American Spectator and The Weekly Standard.

In 2018, Johnson became the founding editor of a new political opinion website, TheArticle.

He is Catholic and is married with four children. He has participated in an Oxford Union debate arguing that Islam is not a religion of peace.

Bibliography
1989 German Neo-Liberals and the Social Market Economy
1991 Thomas Mann: Death in Venice and other stories
2007 White King and Red Queen: How the Cold War was Fought on the Chessboard

References

1957 births
Living people
British male journalists
British critics of Islam
People educated at Langley Grammar School
Alumni of Magdalen College, Oxford
Anti-Islam sentiment in the United Kingdom